Robert Harold Wade (born 12 December 1968) is an English cricketer.  Wade is a right-handed batsman who bowls right-arm medium pace.  He was born at Epsom, Surrey.

Career 

Wade started out at Killinghall in the Nidderdale League before moving on to play in the prestigious Bradford Cricket League for Baildon. Whilst at university, he captained Bangor University to the UAU Semi-Finals in 1991 where they lost to the all conquering Durham side. He played briefly for Knaresborough in the Airedale & Wharfedale League before moving with work to Salisbury.

Wade played for South Wilts Cricket Club 1st XI in the Southern Premier League from 1992 to 2012, captaining for two stints, which included their 2004 championship season.

Wade made his Minor Counties Championship debut for Wiltshire in 1995 against Shropshire.  From 1995 to 1999, he represented the county in 31 Minor Counties matches, the last of which came against Herefordshire.  Wade also represented Wiltshire in the MCCA Knockout Trophy, making his debut in that competition against Hertfordshire in 1996.  From 1996 to 1999, he represented the county in 19 Trophy matches.

Wade also represented Wiltshire in List A matches.  His debut List A match came against the Northamptonshire Cricket Board in the 1999 NatWest Trophy.  From 1999 to 2002, he represented the county in four List A matches, the last of which came against the Hampshire Cricket Board in the 1st round of the 2002 Cheltenham & Gloucester Trophy.  In those four matches he scored 70 runs at a batting average of 17.50, with a high score of 28, and took two catches.  With the ball he took a single wicket at a bowling average of 77.00, with best figures of 1/53.

References

External links
Robert Wade at Cricinfo
Robert Wade at CricketArchive

1968 births
Living people
Cricketers from Epsom
English cricketers
Wiltshire cricketers